Triviella williami is a species of small sea snail, a marine gastropod mollusk in the family Triviidae, the false cowries or trivias.

References

Triviidae
Gastropods described in 2006